The 2015 Conference League South saw the competition increase to 10 clubs. The new clubs were Gloucestershire Warriors who were promoted from the West Of England Rugby League as champions, Torfaen Tigers who moved up from the South Wales Conference and two new clubs Raiders RL and Coventry Bears Reserves. Unfortunately on 10 April Bristol Sonics after postponing their first two games, announced that they would have to withdraw from the league due to player problems and drop down to the West Of England Rugby League. The league season ran from March to September. The teams would play each other home and away with the top four contesting the end of season play-offs to decide the champions

Clubs

League season 
 20 Jan -  Gloucestershire Warriors appoint Gloucestershire All Golds player Richard Jones as their head coach for their debut season
  2 Feb -  Valley Cougars beat Leicester Storm 27-22 in the first round of the Ladbrokes Challenge Cup
  9 Feb -  Nottingham Outlaws are beaten heavily at home 4-50 by Blackbrook in the Ladbrokes Challenge Cup first round
 14 Feb - Valley Cougars are knocked out of the Ladbrokes Challenge Cup by Oulton Raiders 48-0 in the second round
 23 Mar - Opening round of matches sees wins for Gloucestershire Warriors, Leicester Storm, Sheffield Hallam Eagles and Raiders RL
 30 Mar - Sheffield Hallam Eagles go top after winning 28-16 at Nottingham Outlaws
 10 Apl - Bristol Sonics after postponing their opening two games announce that they will have to withdraw from the competition
 13 Apl - Sheffield Hallam Eagles retain top spot with a 54-22 victory at home to new boys Raiders RL
 20 Apl - Valley Cougars end Sheffield Hallam Eagles' unbeaten run in the league stretching back 741 days, 16-14 at Treharris RFC
 27 Apl - Nottingham Outlaws defeat league leaders Coventry Bears Reserves 20-6
 11 May - Valley Cougars beat Gloucestershire Warriors 44-10 scoring 28 unanswered second half points
 18 May - Valley Cougars go top after coming from 0-12 down to beat Leicester Storm 32-24
  1 Jun - Cougars remain top beating Raiders RL 34-16 in a classic Welsh derby, Torfaen Tigers pick up first win against Oxford Cavaliers
  8 Jun - A crowd of 257 watch Torfaen Tigers beat former champions Sheffield Hallam Eagles and move off the foot of the table
 22 Jun - Valley Cougars move four points clear of Coventry Bears Reserves following their 48-12 win in the top of the table clash
 29 Jun - Leaders Valley Cougars beaten for the first time in nine matches as they went down 22-28 at Nottingham Outlaws
  6 Jul - Coventry Bears Reserves moved up to second by beating Raiders RL, Valley Cougars remain top after winning at Sheffield
 20 Jul - Nottingham Outlaws set new club and league record by beating Gloucestershire Warriors 102-6
 27 Jul - In form Raiders RL beat third placed Nottingham Outlaws 35-20 to join race for the play-offs
  3 Aug - Nottingham won a hugely important clash against play-off rivals Coventry
 18 Aug - Coventry secure their top four place with a hard fought win at Torfaen Tigers ending the hosts play off hopes
 24 Aug - Torfaen Tigers set new club and league record when beating Gloucestershire Warriors 110-6
  2 Sep - Valley Cougars confirm top two finish after win against Oxford Cavaliers
  7 Sep - Nottingham Outlaws confirmed as runners up after hard fought win at Leicester Storm 34-14
 11 Sep - Valley Cougars reach Grand Final
 14 Sep - Nottingham Outlaws power their way to the Grand Final beating Raiders RL 36-8
 21 Sep - Nottingham Outlaws wrestled the Conference League South title away from holders Valley Cougars 39-16 at AFC Corsham in Bath.

League table

1 point deducted-Coventry Bears Reserves and Sheffield Hallam Eagles

Play-offs

Grand final
Venue - AFC Corsham, Bath

Grand final mini report 
Nottingham Outlaws lifted their first Conference League South title by beating holders the Valley Cougars at AFC Corsham in Bath 39-16. Ill discipline cost the Valley Cougars who at one point were down to ten men. By the half hour the Outlaws were 18-0 up thanks to tries by John Christie, Jimmy Goodwin and Adrian Chaima all scored a goal by Dan Smith but the holders hit back with two tries in the final five minutes through Craig Lewis and Mike Hurley the first converted by Ben Jones leaving the score 18-10 at half time. At the start of the second half the first Valley Cougars sin binning cost them an immediate try from George Strachan, again scored a goal by Smith. A second sin binning soon after led again to an immediate try for the Outlaws this time from Goodwin, his second try of the match, Smith on this occasion missing his first conversion to leave the score at 28-10. Amazingly while down to 10 men following another sin binning, player coach Dafydd Hellard scored and with a conversion from Marcus Webb the Valley Cougars reduced the arrears to 12 points. But the lack of numbers eventually made the difference as Nottingham scored two more tries through Chaima, his second, and Adam Cunliffe. Player coach Paul Calland kicking one conversion to go with his field goal

Results

Player statistics

Top try scorers

Top goal kicker

Top point scorer

Sources 
 statistics

External links
 Conference League South Website
 Coventry Bears website
 Raiders RL website
 Nottingham Outlaws website
 Leicester Storm website
 Torfaen Tigers website
 Oxford Cavaliers website
 Gloucestershire Warriors website
 Sheffield Hallam Eagles website
 Wales Rugby League website

Rugby League Conference
2015 in Welsh rugby league
2015 in English rugby league